Jan Łaski or Johannes à Lasco (1499 – 8 January 1560) was a Polish Calvinist reformer.  Owing to his influential work in England (1548–1553) during the English Reformation, he is known to the English-speaking world by the Anglicised form John à Lasco (or less commonly, John Laski).

Life

Jan Łaski was born in 1499 as the second son of Jarosław Łaski, the voivode of Sieradz, and Zuzanna of Bąkowa Góra. Following Hermann Dalton’s claims in his nineteenth-century biography of Łaski, a number of historians have identified the Łaski family’s castle in Łask as his place of birth, although recent Polish scholarship concludes that the exact location cannot be ascertained.

His uncle, also Jan Łaski, was the Archbishop of Gniezno, Primate of Poland and Grand Chancellor of the Crown, and he was instrumental in forwarding the early career of his nephew. The coat-of-arms of the Łaski family was Korab.

After his family's fall from political power and prestige, Łaski, a learned priest, went in 1523 to Basel, where he became a close friend of Erasmus and Zwingli. 
In 1542, he became pastor of a Protestant church at Emden, East Frisia. Shortly after, he went to England, where in 1550 he was superintendent of the Strangers' Church of London and had some influence on ecclesiastical affairs in the reign of Edward VI.

Upon the accession of Catholic Queen Mary in July 1553, he fled to Copenhagen with a shipload of refugees from the Strangers' Church. However they were denied refuge there because they would not accept the Augsburg Confession of Faith. They were resettled in Brandenburg. Łaski also helped Catherine Willoughby and her husband after they too had left England. His support enabled them to obtain an appointment from Sigismund II as administrators of Lithuania.
Łaski was a correspondent of John Hooper, whom Łaski supported in the vestments controversy.

In 1556, he was recalled to Poland, where he became secretary to King Sigismund II and was a leader in Calvinism.

His contributions to the Calvinist churches were the establishment of church government in theory and practice, a denial of any distinction between ministers and elders except in terms of who could teach and administer the sacraments. A meeting with the Anabaptist Menno Simons in 1544 led Łaski to coin the term "Mennonites" for the followers of Simons.

He died in Pińczów, Poland.

Works
 Forma ac ratio (1550) -- A "Form and Rationale" for the liturgy of the Stranger churches in London. Possibly influenced the 1552 Book of Common Prayer, John Knox's Scottish order, the Middleburg ordinal, the 1563 German Palatinate order, and the "forms and prayers" in Pieter Dathenus' psalter, which was influential in Dutch Calvinist churches.
 Johannes a Lasco, Opera (Works), ed. Abraham Kuyper (Amsterdam: F. Muller, 1866).

See also
Jan Łaski (1456–1531)
Andrzej Frycz Modrzewski
Wacław of Szamotuły
List of Poles

References

Attribution
 

  
  [English translation of ]

Sources
 Henning P. Juergens, Johannes a Lasco in Ostfriesland: Der Werdegang eines europaeischen Reformators (Tuebingen: Mohr Siebeck, 2002) (Spaetmittelalter und Reformation, Neue Reihe, 18), . viii + 428 S.
 Becker, J., Gemeindeordnung und Kirchenzucht. Johannes a Lascos Kirchenordnung für London (1555) und die reformierte Konfessionsbildung (Leiden, Brill, 2007) (Studies in Medieval and Reformation Traditions, 122), xvi, 592 S.
 Michael S. Springer, Restoring Christ's Church: John a Lasco and the Forma ac ratio (Aldershot, Ashgate, 2007) (St Andrews Studies in Reformation History), 198 pp.

External links

  Dr George M Ella, "Jan Laski. Pan-European Reformer." Mülheim
 Works by Jan Łaski in digital library Polona

1499 births
1560 deaths
People from Łask
Polish Calvinist and Reformed ministers
16th-century Latin-language writers
Polish nobility
Polish Christian clergy
Protestant Reformers
Canons of Gniezno
Canons of Kraków
Translators of the Bible into Polish
16th-century Polish people
16th-century translators
People of the Tudor period
16th-century Calvinist and Reformed ministers
Jan